Veinoplus is a class IIa medical device with CE marking. It is indicated for the treatment of vascular diseases. This is a neuromuscular stimulator developed by an American scientist, Jozef Cywinski.

History 
 2004: Veinoplus design
 2005: Princeps study (first published clinical study) 
 2011: Distributed in 25 countries.

Description 
Veinoplus is composed of a pocket-size device linked to two electrodes. The device has three buttons: a central one to turn on and off the device and two buttons marked “+” and “-” to adjust the intensity of stimulation. The electrodes have to be placed on the calf: either both electrodes on one calf if the venous disease affects only one leg, or one electrode on each calf if the pathology concerns both legs.

Veinoplus technology 
Veinoplus technology is based on the principle of electrostimulation. Thanks to a 9V battery, the device delivers electrical impulses with low frequency and low voltage. Input power is below 0.3W and output power is under 0.05W. The difference between Veinoplus and others electrical muscle stimulators is due to the waveform of the impulses. With this unique waveform, the electrical field can deeply get through the calf and so stimulate an important volume of tissue. As a consequence, Veinoplus triggers deep muscular contractions even if both electrodes are over one meter apart, for instance with one electrode on each calf.

Veinoplus produces safe and painless electrical impulses. Actually, the signal's intensity is below limits authorized by the Association for the Advancement of Medical Instrumentation and American National Standards Institute (AAMI / ANSI ; NS-4; 1986/2002). Moreover, the device doesn't generate excessive electromagnetic interference. Thus it can be used in a plane, except during take-off and landing. Finally, a study on pregnant women has proven that Veinoplus has no side effects on foetus and pregnancy.

Clinical data

Physiological properties 
Veinoplus activates the calf muscular pump which is responsible for 80% of the venous return. The pulsating calf contractions compress deep veins and pump the venous blood against gravity towards the heart.

We can highlight 3 principal hemodynamic effects:
 removal of venous stasis 
 increase of venous outflow in terms of volume and velocity
 inhibition of reflux in superficial and deep veins.

Indications 
Veinoplus is indicated for the treatment of chronic venous insufficiency symptoms: 
 painful or heavy legs
 edema
 night cramps
 restless legs
 post-thrombotic syndrome.

Veinoplus could also ease chronic venous ulcer healing.

Veinoplus can be used either by patients suffering from venous disease or at risk of venous disorders: 
 prolonged immobilization (long flights, jobs with a prolonged sitting or standing position...)
 varicose veins 
 pregnancy
 overweight
 lack of physical exercise
 high heat.

Contra-indications 
The only contra-indication of Veinoplus is wearing a pacemaker.

References

External links 
 Product website
 Company website (ISO 9001 et ISO 13485)

Medical devices